Kodimunai is a village located 22 km north-west of Kanyakumari at Southern Arabian seashore in the Indian state of Tamil Nadu.  The nearest major city is Thiruvananthapuram (capital of India state of Kerala) around 68 km from here. There is a rock located offshore which is the second largest rock in Tamilnadu which located offshore that is a very nice place to visit village full of people are very lovely and friendly

Geography 

Demographics 
 Population count, Kottar Diocese census, Kodimunai had a population of 7250(estimated). Males constitute 51% of the population and females 49%. This consists of around 2,200 families. Kodimunai has an average literacy rate of 70%, higher than the national average of 59.5%: male literacy is 70%, and female literacy is 60%. In Kodimunai, Majority of the population belong to the Roman Catholic Mukkuvar community.

Local Economy 
A significant number of the residents of Kodimunai do jobs related to fishing. This includes deep sea fishing, shallow water fishing, fishing from the shore (known as karamadi in the local language), fishing with mechanized boats, exporting fish, etc. Many of them work in a number of other fields like IT, medicine, education, engineering, trading, cargo shipping, etc. However, there is no noticeable local industry except for fishing. even most of the people discovered the passion towards fishing. of course they contribute certain percentage to Indian GDP even though it is not recognized. soon kodimunai is going to be thrived in economy comparing to other villages. kodimunai do have reliable sources like fishing, thodu and some local stocks which made this village incomparable with other places of kanyakumari. proud to say 80% of the people having high standard of living like USA.
.This village people are going to build new church 2017 on wards, it will be end 2020 and estimated budget is approximately RS 70M. so many people have share in Fishing boat and other fishing equipments.

Educational Institutions 
St.Michael's primary school
St.michael's high school

References

External links 
 Kodimunai.com

Villages in Kanyakumari district